The Catalonia women's football team is the official football team of the Spanish autonomous community of Catalonia. It is organised by the Catalan Football Federation. It is not affiliated with FIFA or UEFA and therefore it is only allowed to play friendly matches.

Results

Players

Current squad 
The following players were called up for the match against Chile on 21 January 2019.

Caps and goals as of 22 January 2019

Head coach: Natalia Arroyo

|-----
! colspan="9" bgcolor="#FFDEAD" align="left" | Goalkeeper
|----- bgcolor="#FFECCE"

|-----
! colspan="9" bgcolor="#B0D3FB" align="left" | Defender
|----- bgcolor="#E7FAEC"

|-----
! colspan="9" bgcolor="#BBF0C9" align="left" | Midfielder
|----- bgcolor="#DFEDFD"

|-----
! colspan="9" bgcolor="#FFACB3" align="left" | Forward
|----- bgcolor="#FFD2D6"

Recent call-ups
The following players were named to a squad in the last three marches.

Notable players
Catalan players who represented FIFA international teams

See also

 Catalonia men's national football team

External links

Catalonia national football team
Spanish autonomous women's football teams
football